Adolphe Jauréguy (18 February 1898 – 4 September 1977) was a French rugby union player who competed in the 1924 Summer Olympics. He was born in Ostabat-Asme and died in Toulouse. He played in nine Five Nations Championships: in 1920, 1922, 1923, 1924, 1925, 1926, 1927, 1928 and 1929. In 1924 he won the silver medal as member of the French team.

References

1898 births
1977 deaths
French rugby union players
Olympic rugby union players of France
Rugby union players at the 1924 Summer Olympics
Olympic silver medalists for France
France international rugby union players
Stade Toulousain players
French-Basque people
Medalists at the 1924 Summer Olympics
Sportspeople from Pyrénées-Atlantiques
People from Lower Navarre